Cephetola katerae is a butterfly in the family Lycaenidae. It is found in Cameroon, the Democratic Republic of the Congo, Uganda, Kenya, western Tanzania and Zambia. Its habitat consists of forests, including riparian forests.

References

Butterflies described in 1962
Poritiinae